"I Wanna Dance" is a song by Swedish recording artist Melodie MC, released in 1993 as the fourth single from his debut album, Northland Wonderland (1993). It features vocals by singer Lotta Sundgren, and peaked at number six in Sweden and number eight in the Netherlands. Additionally, it was a top 30 hit in Belgium while it reached number 72 on the Eurochart Hot 100 in November 1993. Outside Europe, the song was a hit in Australia, peaking at number 21.

Critical reception
Pan-European magazine Music & Media wrote, "Sequencers and buzzing synths pave the way for this Swedish rapper. who gives us exactly what both his name and the song title promise: melodic dance."

Track listing
 12", Sweden (1993)
"I Wanna Dance" (X-10-Ded Version) – 6:35
"I Wanna Dance" (Radio Version) – 4:34
"I Wanna Dance" (Statikk Vs Tom Droid Version) – 6:43

 CD single, Sweden (1993)
"I Wanna Dance" (Radio) – 4:34
"I Wanna Dance" (X-10-DED) – 6:35

 CD maxi, Europe (1993)
"I Wanna Dance" (Radio Version) – 4:34
"I Wanna Dance" (X-10-DED Version) – 6:35
"I Wanna Dance" (Statikk Vs. Tom Droid) – 6:46

Charts

Weekly charts

Year-end charts

References

 

1993 singles
1993 songs
Eurodance songs
English-language Swedish songs
Songs about dancing